
Ernst-Georg Kurt Philipp (13 October 1912 – 16 March 2005) was a German officer (Oberst) in the Wehrmacht during World War II and a Generalmajor in the Bundeswehr. He was  a recipient of the  Knight's Cross of the Iron Cross with Oak Leaves of Nazi Germany

Awards and decorations
 Iron Cross (1939) 2nd Class (29 September 1939) & 1st Class (21 October 1939)

 Knight's Cross of the Iron Cross with Oak Leaves
 Knight's Cross on 28 November 1940 as Oberleutnant and chief of the 4./Panzer-Regiment 1
 599th Oak Leaves on 30 September 1944 as Major and Panzer officer of the Stab AOK 8 (8. Armee)

References

Citations

Bibliography

 
 

1912 births
2005 deaths
Recipients of the Knight's Cross of the Iron Cross with Oak Leaves
Commanders Crosses of the Order of Merit of the Federal Republic of Germany
Major generals of the German Army
People from Dzierżoniów
German Army officers of World War II